The 1998 Montana Grizzlies football team represented the University of Montana in the 1998 NCAA Division I-AA football season. The Grizzlies were led by third-year head coach Mick Dennehy and played their home games at Washington–Grizzly Stadium.

Schedule

References

Montana
Montana Grizzlies football seasons
Big Sky Conference football champion seasons
Montana Grizzlies football